Anders Kristiansen (born 7 September 1979) is a Danish badminton player. In 2010, he won the bronze medal at the European Badminton Championships in men's doubles event with his partner Kasper Henriksen.

Achievements

European Championships 
Men's doubles

Mixed doubles

BWF Grand Prix 
The BWF Grand Prix has two levels, the BWF Grand Prix and Grand Prix Gold. It is a series of badminton tournaments sanctioned by the Badminton World Federation (BWF) since 2007.

Mixed doubles

  BWF Grand Prix Gold tournament
  BWF Grand Prix tournament

BWF International Challenge/Series 
Men's doubles

  BWF International Challenge tournament
  BWF International Series tournament

References

External links 
 

Danish male badminton players
Living people
1979 births
People from Frederikssund Municipality
Sportspeople from the Capital Region of Denmark